Inauguration of Harry S. Truman may refer to: 

First inauguration of Harry S. Truman, 1945
Second inauguration of Harry S. Truman, 1949